Elise Gravel (born 1977) is a Canadian children's book author and illustrator from Montreal, Quebec.

Gravel's original books and graphic novels focus on wacky and often gross content. In 2012, she won a Governor General's Award for Children's Illustration in French for her book La clé à molette.

Gravel has written more than thirty books and her work has been translated into over twelve languages. She studied graphic design, before becoming an illustrator. Gravel publishes in both English and in French.

She is the daughter of writer François Gravel and Murielle Grégoire.

In 2022, the Writers' Trust of Canada awarded Gravel the Vicky Metcalf Award for Literature for Young People in honour of her body of work.

Selected work 
 Le Grand Antonio (2014), translated into English as The Great Antonio (2017), biography of Antonio Barichievich, known as The Great Antonio

References 

1977 births
Living people
Artists from Montreal
Governor General's Award-winning children's illustrators
Canadian children's book illustrators
Governor General's Award-winning children's writers
Canadian children's writers in French
Writers from Montreal
Canadian women children's writers